The following lists events that happened during 1884 in New Zealand.

Incumbents

Regal and viceregal
Head of State – Queen Victoria
Governor – Lieutenant-General Sir William Jervois.

Government and law
The 1884 general election is held on 22 July. Afterwards the 9th New Zealand Parliament is formed.

Speaker of the House – Maurice O'Rorke.
Premier – Harry Atkinson loses the Premiership to Robert Stout on 16 August, regains it on 28 August and loses it again to Stout on 3 September.
Minister of Finance – Harry Atkinson is replaced on 16 August by Julius Vogel. He is relieved of the position on 28 August and resumes it again on 3 September.
Chief Justice – Hon Sir James Prendergast

Main centre leaders
Mayor of Auckland – William Waddel
Mayor of Christchurch – George Ruddenklau followed by Charles Hulbert
Mayor of Dunedin – William Parker Street followed by Arthur Scoular
Mayor of Wellington – George Fisher

Sport

Cricket

 1883–84 New Zealand cricket season
 1884–85 New Zealand cricket season

Horse racing
New Zealand Cup winner: Vanguard
New Zealand Derby winner: Black Rose
Auckland Cup winner: The Poet
Wellington Cup winner: The Poet

see also :Category:Horse races in New Zealand.

Rugby union
 1884 New Zealand rugby union tour of New South Wales: A New Zealand team makes an overseas tour for the first time. The team makes a return visit  (see 1882) to the Southern Rugby Union in New South Wales and wins all eight matches with 167 points for and 17 against.

The Hawke's Bay union is formed.

Provincial club rugby champions include:
see also :Category:Rugby union in New Zealand

Shooting
Ballinger Belt: Private Walter Churton (Wanganui)

Births
 26 February (in Australia): Frederick Doidge, politician (d. 1954).
 10 March: Adam Adamson, mayor of Invercargill (d. 1984).
 12 July: Robert McKeen, politician (d. 1974).
 16 November: Fred Jones, politician (d. 1966).

Deaths
 28 February: Sir Robert Douglas, 3rd Baronet, soldier and politician
1 March: William Jarvis Willis, member of the House of Representatives
 27 April: Henry Tancred, politician
 1 June: Robert Heaton Rhodes, member of the House of Representatives 
 27 June: Benjamin Tonks, member of the House of Representatives and Mayor of Auckland City
 13 July: Francis Hull, member of the House of Representatives 
 23 July: William Adams, member of the House of Representatives and provincial superintendent
 30 August: William Wood, member of the House of Representatives and provincial superintendent
 7 September: Alfred Nesbit Brown, missionary
 28 October: Thomas Luther Shepherd, member of the House of Representatives
 1 December: William Swainson, first Speaker of the New Zealand Legislative Council
 11 September: (in England) Walter Brodie, member of the House of Representatives
 20 December: John George Miles, member of the House of Representatives

See also
List of years in New Zealand
Timeline of New Zealand history
History of New Zealand
Military history of New Zealand
Timeline of the New Zealand environment
Timeline of New Zealand's links with Antarctica

References
General
 Romanos, J. (2001) New Zealand Sporting Records and Lists. Auckland: Hodder Moa Beckett. 
Specific

External links

 
New Zealand
New Zealand